The Coronation Carpet is a Persian carpet owned by the Danish Royal Family. It is stored at Rosenborg Castle in Copenhagen. According to the Royal Danish Collections, the carpet was made in Isfahan in the 17th century. The size is 12 feet, 2 inches by 17 feet, 1 inch. As the name suggests, it is the carpet on which Danish kings were anointed.

The carpet is made of silk pile and gold and silver threads.

The Coronation Carpet is only shown to the public once a year during Easter together with a small group of chenille carpets.

References
 Denmark's Coronation Carpets by Friedrich Spuhler, Preben Mellbye-Hansen and Majken Thorvildsen. The Royal Danish Collections at Rosenborg Palace 1987.

External links
Rosenborg Castle

Danish monarchy
Persian rugs and carpets
Individual rugs and carpets
Denmark–Iran relations